Carl Zimmerman (24 July 1898 – 10 May 1969) was a New Zealand cricketer. He played nine first-class matches for Otago between 1925 and 1930. He lived most of his life in Oamaru, working first as a teacher, then as a lawyer.

Life and work career
Carl Zimmerman's father, Richard Carl Zimmerman, was a violinist, conductor and violin teacher who migrated to New Zealand from Austria in 1888 and eventually settled in Christchurch. Carl was educated at Christchurch Boys' High School and at Canterbury College, where he was awarded a Master of Arts degree with first-class honours in history.

He taught history at Waitaki Boys' High School in Oamaru from 1920. One of his pupils there, Charles Brasch, later described him as one of the better teachers at the school, and said of him, "I liked our manly young history master, Carl Zimmerman, good cricketer and handsome upright figure, blue-eyed with pale skin and black close-curling hair, who had indifferent health and perhaps some tender susceptibilities under a rather quick-fire manner and uncertainty of temper."

He married Margaret Grave in Oamaru in August 1925. In 1926 he began studying law. In 1932 he went into partnership with his father-in-law when he joined the Oamaru law firm of Lee, Grave and Grave.

Cricket career
In his youth in Christchurch, Zimmerman was a rugby union player as well as a cricketer, representing Canterbury at rugby. After he moved to Oamaru in 1920 he represented the minor association of North Otago at cricket from the mid-1920s to the mid-1940s, and was one of the few North Otago players to be selected to play first-class cricket for Otago, which he did regularly in the late 1920s. In 1925–26, in his second match for Otago, he made 77 in the second innings against Auckland, adding 151 for the fourth wicket with his captain, Ernest Blamires.

Playing for the Oamaru Cricket Club, he won the North Otago Cricket Association batting award in 1925–26, with an average of 91. In late 1937 he scored 113, 212 and 151 in successive innings for Oamaru. When the Oamaru Cricket Club celebrated its sesquicentenary in 2014, Zimmerman was named in its all-time greatest eleven.

Playing for North Otago against the touring Australians in 1927-28, Zimmerman reached his 50 in 28 minutes, and his century in 46 minutes, finishing on 117 not out. The Australians were resting their leading bowlers. Two weeks previously, in North Otago's match against Southland, he had scored 117 then taken 4 for 5 on the opening day. He took four wickets in each innings and made 145 not out against Hawke's Bay in 1932–33.

See also
 List of Otago representative cricketers

References

External links
 

1898 births
1969 deaths
New Zealand cricketers
People educated at Christchurch Boys' High School
University of New Zealand alumni
Otago cricketers
Cricketers from Auckland
Cricketers from Oamaru
New Zealand people of Austrian descent
Canterbury rugby union players
20th-century New Zealand lawyers